Charles Simmons (1798–1856) was an American clergyman and author.

His notable publications include Slavery of the United States to sinful and foolish custom, A Scripture manual, alphabetically and systematically arranged, designed to facilitate the finding of proof texts, and A laconic manual and brief remarker containing over a thousand subjects, alphabetically and systematically arranged.

References

External links
 Online Books by Charles Simmons

American clergy
1798 births
1856 deaths
19th-century American writers
19th-century American male writers
19th-century American clergy